Table Mountain is a peak rising on the north side of the Columbia River in Washington state, about  north-northwest of Bonneville Dam. It is one of the most spectacular landmarks of the Columbia River Gorge. Its southeast face drops  in less than one horizontal mile (1.6 km.), and is topped by an almost vertical  cliff. Table Mountain is joined by the similar Greenleaf Peak to the northeast, and also by Hamilton Mountain to the southwest, which is lower,, but similarly steep and much closer to the Columbia. Together these peaks form an impressive group on the Washington side of the Gorge.

Between 1425 and 1450 AD the south side of Table Mountain sheared off and dammed the Columbia River in an event known as the Bonneville Slide.

The river soon carved a new bend around to the south, but for a while Native Americans living in the area could walk across. This led to the legend known as the Bridge of the Gods.

References

Mountains of Washington (state)
Columbia River Gorge
Mountains of Skamania County, Washington
Washington Natural Areas Program
Protected areas of Skamania County, Washington